The Roman Catholic Diocese of Hiroshima is a diocese located in the city of Hiroshima in the Ecclesiastical province of Osaka 大阪 in Japan.

History
 May 4, 1923: Established as Apostolic Vicariate of Hiroshima from the Diocese of Osaka
 June 30, 1959: Promoted as Diocese of Hiroshima

Leadership
 Bishops of Hiroshima (Roman rite)
 Bishop Alexis Mitsuru Shirahama, P.S.S (since 2016.09.19)
 Bishop Thomas Aquino Manyo Maeda (2011.06.13-2014.08.20) 
 Bishop Joseph Atsumi Misue (ヨゼフ三末篤實) (1985.03.29 - 2011.06.13)
 Bishop Dominic Yoshimatsu Noguchi (ドミニコ野口由松) (1959.12.19 – 1985.03.29)
 Vicars Apostolic of Hiroshima 広島 (Roman rite) 
 Bishop Johannes Ross (ヨハネス・ロス), S.J. (1928.05.18 – 1940)
 Archbishop Heinrich Döring (ハインリヒ・デーリング), S.J. (1921.06.16 – 1927.07.14)

See also
Roman Catholicism in Japan

References

External links
  Diocese website
 Catholic Bishops' Conference of Japan
 GCatholic.org
 Catholic Hierarchy 

Roman Catholic dioceses in Japan
Christian organizations established in 1923
Roman Catholic dioceses and prelatures established in the 20th century